Nika Darbaidze (born 3 March 1998) is a Georgian basketball player for BC TSU Tbilisi of the Georgian Superliga and the Georgian national team.

National team career 
Darbaidze has been constantly called up for the Georgian national team since 2017. He has represented Georgia at U16, U18, and U20 national teams.

References

External links 
Eurobasket.com Profile
Realgm Profile
Superleague Profile

1999 births
Living people
Men's basketball players from Georgia (country)
Shooting guards
Power forwards (basketball)
Basketball players from Tbilisi
BC Dinamo Tbilisi players
Small forwards
KK Lovćen players